Taine may refer to:

Given name
Taine Basham (born 1999), Welsh rugby player
Taine Murray (born 2002), New Zealand basketball player
Taine Paton (born 1989), South African field hockey player
Taine Pechet, American thoracic surgeon
Taine Plumtree (born 2000), Welsh born New Zealand rugby player
Taine Randell (born 1974), New Zealand rugby player
Taine Robinson (born 1999), New Zealand rugby player

Surname
Christophe Taine (born 1973), French footballer
Hippolyte Taine (1828–1893), French critic and historian
John Taine, pen name of Eric Temple Bell (1883–1960), Scottish novelist

Fiction
Charles Foster Taine, fictional character in the DC Comics universe
Hiram Taine, fictional protagonist in the 1958 novel The Big Front Yard by Clifford Simak
Roger Taine, fictional protagonist of the novels A Rough Shoot and A Time to Kill by Geoffrey Household 
Sydney Taine, fictional character in the Nightside comic series of Robert Weinberg

See also

Antaine
Tain (disambiguation)
Tana (disambiguation)
Toine